The Elgin Opera House, located at 100 North 8th Street in Elgin, Oregon, United States, is listed (under the name Elgin City Hall and Opera House) on the National Register of Historic Places.

See also
 National Register of Historic Places listings in Union County, Oregon

References

External links

 

National Register of Historic Places in Union County, Oregon